Cristian Stellini (born 27 April 1975) is an Italian football coach and former player. He is assistant manager at Tottenham Hotspur, having been appointed with head coach Antonio Conte in November 2021.

Playing career 
Stellini played for Novara (Serie C2), Spal (Serie C1) before joined Ternana of Serie C2 in October 1996. He won promotion twice for the team to Serie B in summer 1998. In summer 2000, he joined Como of Serie C1, he won promotions again, reaching Serie A in 2002. he made his Serie A debut on  14 September 2002 against Empoli F.C.

In summer 2003, Stellini joined Juventus, but suffered from a major leg injury. After playing just twice, he moved to Genoa. 

During Stellini's time at Genoa, the Caso Genoa scandal saw the club relegated to Serie C. Stellini remained at the club, however, and helped win them promotion back to Serie A.

Coaching career 
In 2011, Stellini joined Antonio Conte's coaching team at Juventus, and passed the category 2 coaching exam. However, in 2012 Stellini was suspended for two and a half years by the FIGC following allegations of match fixing. He subsequently resigned from his post as technical assistant at Juventus.

Stellini made his return to football as youth coach of Genoa from 2015 to 2017. 

In June 2017, Stellini was named new head coach of Lega Pro club Alessandria, signing a two-year contract. He was dismissed on 20 November 2017 due to poor results.

Stellini joined Conte's managerial staff at Inter ahead of the 2019–20 season. Stellini won the Scudetto with Inter during the 2020–21 season, managing the team to three victories when Conte was suspended for yellow card accumulation.

Cristian once again linked up with Conte at Tottenham Hotspur, resuming his role as Assistant Manager. In the final game of the 2022–23 Champions League Group Stage, Stellini led the team to a victory at Marseille, earning Spurs a spot in the knockout stage and winning the group in the process. 

In February 2023, it was confirmed that Conte required gallbladder surgery to recover from cholecystitis and therefore required a period of recuperation following the surgery. As Assistant Manager, Stellini assumed Conte's duties on an interim basis for the duration of his recovery. Stellini managed a Tottenham game for the second time on 5 February, a 1-0 home win against Manchester City. Conte made his return to the dugout for Tottenham's following two games, a 4-1 defeat to Leicester City and 1-0 defeat to AC Milan, however it was then announced that he would return to Italy to continue his recovery; as a result, Stellini once again assumed management responsibilities, and in his first match back, led Spurs to a 2-0 victory against West Ham United, followed by another 2–0 victory against Chelsea.

References

External links 
 http://www.asbari.it/index.php?option=com_campionato&task=giocatore&giocatore=2881

1974 births
Living people
People from Cuggiono
Italian footballers
Italian football managers
Novara F.C. players
S.P.A.L. players
Ternana Calcio players
Como 1907 players
Modena F.C. players
Genoa C.F.C. players
S.S.C. Bari players
Serie A players
Association football defenders
A.C.N. Siena 1904 non-playing staff
Juventus F.C. non-playing staff
Inter Milan non-playing staff
Tottenham Hotspur F.C. non-playing staff
Footballers from Lombardy
Sportspeople from the Metropolitan City of Milan